Albatross-class minesweeper may refer to one of the following minesweeper ship classes of the United States Navy:

 
 

Mine warfare vessel classes